Aníbal Carrillo Iramain is a Paraguayan politician who was the presidential candidate of the Frente Guasú in the April 2013 elections. Frente Guasú is a left-wing coalition led by the previous election's winner and impeached president Fernando Lugo. Carrillo obtained 3.32% of the vote.

External links
Frente Guasú official website

References

Living people
Paraguayan politicians
Year of birth missing (living people)